The 1946 New York Giants season was the franchise's 64th season. The team finished in eighth place in the National League with a 61–93 record, 36 games behind the St. Louis Cardinals.

Regular season

Season standings 

The 1946 Giants are the original subject of the phrase "nice guys finish last", a condensation of a reference to them by Leo Durocher of the Brooklyn Dodgers. The original quote by Durocher was "The nice guys are all over there, in seventh place." (July 6, 1946), seventh place being last place in the National League.

Record vs. opponents

Notable transactions 
 September 16, 1946: Red Kress was released by the Giants.

Roster

Player stats

Batting

Starters by position 
Note: Pos = Position; G = Games played; AB = At bats; H = Hits; Avg. = Batting average; HR = Home runs; RBI = Runs batted in

Other batters 
Note: G = Games played; AB = At bats; H = Hits; Avg. = Batting average; HR = Home runs; RBI = Runs batted in

Pitching

Starting pitchers 
Note: G = Games pitched; IP = Innings pitched; W = Wins; L = Losses; ERA = Earned run average; SO = Strikeouts

Other pitchers 
Note: G = Games pitched; IP = Innings pitched; W = Wins; L = Losses; ERA = Earned run average; SO = Strikeouts

Relief pitchers 
Note: G = Games pitched; W = Wins; L = Losses; SV = Saves; ERA = Earned run average; SO = Strikeouts

Farm system 

LEAGUE CHAMPIONS: Erie, Peekskill

Notes

References 
 1946 New York Giants team at Baseball-Reference
 1946 New York Giants team at Baseball Almanac

New York Giants (NL)
San Francisco Giants seasons
New York Giants season
New York
1940s in Manhattan
Washington Heights, Manhattan